William Taylor may refer to:

Military
William Taylor (Royal Navy officer, born 1760) (1760–1842), British naval officer
William P. Taylor (Virginian) (1778–1834), American lawyer and militia Brigadier General
William Rogers Taylor (1811–1889), U.S. Rear Admiral
William G. Taylor (1829–1910), American sailor and Medal of Honor recipient
William Taylor (Alamo defender) (fl. 1836), fatality at the Battle of the Alamo
William Taylor (Medal of Honor) (1836–1902), Union Army soldier and officer during the American Civil War
William Taylor (Royal Navy officer, born 1908) (William Horace Taylor, 1908–1999), British recipient of the George Cross
William D. Taylor (general), United States Army general

Political figures

Australia
William Taylor (New South Wales politician) (1862–1922), member of the New South Wales Legislative Assembly
William Taylor (Tasmanian politician) (1894–1964), member of the Tasmanian Parliament
William Taylor (Victorian politician) (1818–1903), pastoralist and member of the Victorian Legislative Council
William Frederick Taylor (1840–1927), medical doctor and member of the Queensland Legislative Council
William Tydd Taylor (1814–1862), member of the New South Wales Legislative Assembly

Canada
William Benajah Taylor (1794–?), merchant and politician in Nova Scotia
William Henry Taylor (politician) (1848–1916), Canadian politician in the Legislative Assembly of Ontario
William Horace Taylor (1889–1986), Canadian politician
William Taylor (New Brunswick politician) (died 1834), businessman and political figure in New Brunswick

New Zealand
William Waring Taylor (1819–1903), New Zealand politician

United Kingdom
William Taylor (MP for Windsor) (fl. 1640), Member of Parliament (MP) for Windsor
William Taylor (MP for Leominster) (fl. 1797), MP for Leominster
William Thomas Taylor (1848–?), British colonial administrator
W. B. Taylor (William Benjamin Taylor, 1875–1932), British Member of Parliament
Sir William Taylor, 1st Baronet (1902–1972), British Conservative Member of Parliament
William Taylor (preacher) (fl. 2014–2017), Anglican minister elected to the Common Council of the City of London Corporation

United States
William Taylor (New York politician) (1791–1865), U.S. Congressman from New York
William L. Taylor (1931–2010), attorney and civil rights activist who served on the United States Commission on Civil Rights
William P. Taylor (1791–1863), U.S. Congressman from Virginia
William Robert Taylor (1820–1909), governor of Wisconsin
William S. Taylor (American politician, born 1795) (1795–1858), member of the Alabama, Mississippi, and Texas state legislatures, Speaker of the Texas House of Representatives
William S. Taylor (Kentucky politician) (1853–1928), Kentucky attorney general and governor; indicted for conspiracy to assassinate the succeeding governor
William Taylor (Virginia politician, born 1788) (1788–1846), congressman and lawyer from Virginia
William J. Taylor (born 1932), politician in the state of Florida
William B. Taylor Jr. (born 1947), ambassador to Ukraine from 2006 to 2009

Religious figures
William Taylor (Lollard) (died 1423), English Priest and theologian, burnt as a Lollard
William Taylor (Scottish minister) (1744–1823), Scottish Minister, Moderator and Principal
William Taylor (moderator) (1748–1825), minister of the Church of Scotland
William Taylor (bishop) (1821–1902), U.S. Bishop of the Methodist Episcopal Church
William Mackergo Taylor (1829–1895), U.S. Congregational minister
William W. Taylor (1853–1884), American leader in The Church of Jesus Christ of Latter-day Saints
William Taylor (Archdeacon of Liverpool) (died 1906), Archdeacon in the Diocese of Liverpool
William Taylor (Dean of Portsmouth) (born 1956), Anglican priest
William Carey Taylor, English Baptist minister and missionary

Scientists and engineers
William B. Taylor (engineer) (1824–1895), American civil engineer and surveyor in New York
William Taylor (inventor) (1865–1937), British inventor
William C. Taylor (materials scientist), (1886–1958) of Howard N. Potts Medal
William Taylor (ophthalmologist) (1912–1989), British ophthalmologist and expert on albinism
William Randolph Taylor, American botanist
William R. Taylor, psychiatrist, see Fuzzy cognitive map

Sports people

American football
William S. Taylor (American football) (fl. 1928–1940), head football coach at University of Arkansas-Pine Bluff 1937–1940
Willie Taylor (Canadian football) (born c.1936), American player of Canadian football
Willie Taylor (American football) (born 1955), American NFL football wide receiver

Cricket
William Taylor (Surrey cricketer) (1821–1878), English cricketer
William Taylor (Derbyshire cricketer) (1885–1976), English cricketer
William Taylor (Worcestershire cricketer) (1885–1959), English cricketer

Other sports
William Taylor (jockey, born 1819), rode in 1846 Grand National
William Taylor (jockey, died 1950), rode in 1898 Grand National
W. F. Taylor (William Franklin Taylor; 1877–1945), Canadian ice hockey administrator, founding president of the Canadian Amateur Hockey Association
William "Lady" Taylor (1880–1942), Canadian ice hockey player
William Taylor (footballer, born 1886) (1886–1966), English footballer
William Taylor (cyclist) (1900–?), Canadian Olympic cyclist
Willie Taylor (footballer) (died 1949), Scottish footballer
Willie Taylor (basketball) (fl. 1960s), American basketball player

Writers, publishers, illustrators
William Taylor (bookseller) (fl. 1708–1724), bookseller trading at St. Paul's Churchyard, London, and publisher of Daniel Defoe's Robinson Crusoe in 1719
William Taylor (historian) (1922–2014), U.S. historian, professor, and author
William Taylor (man of letters) (1765–1836), English scholar and linguist
William Taylor (writer) (1938–2015), New Zealand children's writer
William B. Taylor (historian) (fl. 1965–2007), American historian
William Cooke Taylor (1800–1849), Irish writer
William Davis Taylor (1908–2002), American newspaper publisher, The Boston Globe
William Ladd Taylor (1854–1926), American illustrator
William O. Taylor (1871–1955), American newspaper publisher, The Boston Globe
William O. Taylor II (1932–2011), American newspaper publisher, The Boston Globe
William Benjamin Sarsfield Taylor, Irish artist and writer

Legal professionals
William Taylor (lawyer) (fl. 1971–2005), British lawyer who was lead counsel for Abdelbaset al-Megrahi at the Lockerbie trial
William Taylor (police officer) (born 1947), British police officer
William A. Taylor (1928–2010), Justice of the Wyoming Supreme Court
William H. Taylor (judge) (1863–1926), Justice of the Vermont Supreme Court
William M. Taylor (1876–1959), Justice of the Supreme Court of Texas
William McLaughlin Taylor Jr. (1909–1985), U.S. federal judge
William Taylor (judge) (born 1944), English senior Circuit Judge

Others
William Taylor (headmaster) (1840–1910), British teacher, headmaster of Sir Walter St John's Grammar School For Boys
William Desmond Taylor (1872–1922), U.S. film director
William Henry Taylor (1906–1965), alleged Soviet agent
William Taylor, video game designer, see Blazing Angels 2
William Taylor (folk song), a British folk song
William Taylor (cotton manufacturer) (died 1852), cotton manufacturer in Lancashire, England
William Taylor (academic) (1930–2005), English educationalist, vice-chancellor of the University of Hull
William Taylor (Master of Christ's College, Cambridge) (16th century), academic
William Joseph Taylor, British medallist and engraver
Willie Taylor (born 1981), American singer and songwriter
William Taylor (Nights: Journey of Dreams), video game character
William Taylor & Son, an apartment building in Cleveland, United States

See also
Billy Taylor (disambiguation)
William Tayler (1808–1892), British civil servant of the East India Company
William Taylor House (disambiguation)
Will Taylor (disambiguation)
Willy Taylor (1916–2000), Northumbrian fiddler
List of people with surname Taylor